Match Cup Sweden (previously Swedish Match Cup, Stena Match Cup Sweden) is a sailing event on the World Match Racing Tour held in Marstrand, Sweden in the beginning of July every year. Organizers of Match Cup Sweden are The Royal Gothenburg Yacht Club and Brandspot.

The tournament consists of an open class and a women’s class, both of which compete in match race sailing. It is one of the pivotal events on the World Match Racing Tour, being among the longest running events on the tour. The event has attracted well over 100.000 spectators  on an annual basis.

History
The first edition of Match Cup Sweden was held in 1994, then as Swedish Match Cup. The initiator of the event was Swedish sailing legend Magnus Holmberg, who with the help from The Royal Gothenburg Yacht Club and Swedish Match arranged the first event in Marstrand, Sweden.

Between 1994 and 2002 the tournament used the DS 37 Matchracer boat, until the introduction of the Swedish Match 40 in 2003. The new boat was designed by another sailing legend, Pelle Petterson, specifically for the Swedish Match Tour, which was the equivalent of today’s World Match Racing Tour.

Due to a change of the Swedish legislation prior to the 2006 event, Swedish Match, being a tobacco company, were prohibited of sponsoring the event. Losing its title sponsor, the 2006 event had to be cancelled, only to return in 2007 under the new name ’’’Match Cup Sweden’’’.  The organizers then decided to go back to the original DS 37 Matchracer boats.

Hall of Fame
For the 15th edition of Match Cup Sweden in 2009, the organizers set up a Hall of Fame for to celebrate the already rich history of the event. Two inductees were elected for the opening of the Hall of Fame; Magnus Holmberg and Peter Gilmour.

Magnus Holmberg, Sweden, was inducted for his vital role in the founding and upbringing of the event, arguably being the most important individual of its history. Along with stellar performances on the water, his place in the Hall of Fame was meant to be.

Peter Gilmour, Australia, is, among many big names victorious in Marstrand, the biggest of them all. He celebrated his induction by winning his seventh Match Cup Sweden, meaning that he had won almost half of the editions in the history of the event. A pioneer in matchracing, Gilmour is now both a household name in Marstrand as well as the current acting president of the World Match Racing Tour.

Location
One of the most popular locations among the sailors, Marstrand offers a unique combination of world class sailing and an extraordinary spectators’ arena. The narrow waters on the South side of Marstrand brings the audience within meters from the boats, still providing enough wind to create intense sailing. The picturesque environments that Marstrand and its surroundings offer has single-handedly attracted a great number of both world-class sailors and spectators to the event throughout the years.

Results

Open class

Women’s class

External links
Stena Match Cup Sweden website 
Royal Gothenburg Yacht Club website 
Brandspot website 
World Match Racing Tour website

References

Sailing competitions in Sweden
Recurring sporting events established in 1994
World Match Racing Tour
Sport in Västra Götaland County
Yachting races
Match racing competitions
Royal Gothenburg Yacht Club